Francisco Llamas (active 1700) was a Spanish painter of the Baroque period, active in Madrid.

He was a pupil of Luca Giordano. On the ceilings  of the halls which separate the two cloisters of the College of Monks in El Escorial, he represented The Trinity, The Creation, Chief Doctors of the Church, Chief Philosophers, The Sciences, The Virtues, The Elements,  and several other subjects. He also decorated the Cathedral of Ávila, and the Hermitage of our Lady of Prado, near Talavera de la Reina.

References

17th-century Spanish painters
Spanish male painters
18th-century Spanish painters
18th-century Spanish male artists
Spanish Baroque painters
Year of death unknown
Year of birth unknown